Dashava is an urban-type settlement in Stryi Raion of Lviv Oblast in Ukraine. It is located on the right bank of the Berezhnytsia, a right tributary of the Dniester. Dashava belongs to Stryi urban hromada, one of the hromadas of Ukraine. Population:

Economy

Transportation
There is infrequent passenger traffic.

Dashava is connected by roads with Stryi, Zhydachiv, and Zhuravne, where it has further access to Lviv, Ternopil, and Uzhhorod.

Notable people
 Stanisław Ożóg, Polish athlete and Olympian

References

Urban-type settlements in Stryi Raion